Áedh Ua Flaithbheartaigh (died 1178) was King of Iar Connacht.

Biography

The annals record that Áedh died at Annaghdown, demonstrating that the Muintir Murchada still held some influence east of Lough Corrib into the late 12th century.

In 1185, the annals state "The West of Connaught was burned, as well churches and houses, by Donnell O'Brien and the English." In  1196, "Cathal, the son of Hugh O'Flaherty, was slain by the son of Murtough Midheach."

Áedh appears to have been succeeded by his son, Ruaidhri.

See also

 Ó Flaithbertaigh

References

 West or H-Iar Connaught Ruaidhrí Ó Flaithbheartaigh, 1684 (published 1846, ed. James Hardiman).
 Origin of the Surname O'Flaherty, Anthony Matthews, Dublin, 1968, p. 40.
 Irish Kings and High-Kings, Francis John Byrne (2001), Dublin: Four Courts Press, 
 Annals of Ulster at CELT: Corpus of Electronic Texts at University College Cork
 Byrne, Francis John (2001), Irish Kings and High-Kings, Dublin: Four Courts Press, 

People from County Galway
1178 deaths
Aedh
12th-century Irish monarchs
Year of birth unknown